
Gmina Słubice is a rural gmina (administrative district) in Płock County, Masovian Voivodeship, in east-central Poland.

Villages
Gmina Słubice contains the villages and settlements of Alfonsów, Budy, Grabowiec, Grzybów, Jamno, Juliszew, Łaziska, Leonów, Nowosiadło, Nowy Wiączemin, Nowy Życk, Piotrkówek, Potok Biały, Rybaki, Sady, Słubice, Świniary, Wiączemin Polski, Wymyśle Polskie and Życk Polski.

Neighbouring gminas
Gmina Słubice is bordered by the gminas of Bodzanów, Gąbin, Iłów, Mała Wieś, Sanniki and Słupno.

References
Polish official population figures 2006

Slubice
Płock County